"Rockin' Around the Christmas Tree" is a Christmas song written by Johnny Marks and recorded by Brenda Lee in 1958; it has since been recorded by numerous other music artists. By the song's 50th anniversary in 2008, Lee's original version had sold over 25 million copies around the world with the 4th most digital downloads sold of any Christmas single.

Original recording by Brenda Lee 
"Rockin' Around the Christmas Tree" was written by Johnny Marks, who had previously penned "Rudolph the Red-Nosed Reindeer" and "A Holly Jolly Christmas". In spite of her adult voice, Lee recorded the song when she was only 13 years old. In a 2019 interview with The Tennessean, Lee recalled that she had no knowledge as to why Marks wanted her specifically to sing it: "I was only 12 [sic], and I had not had a lot of success in records, but for some reason he heard me and wanted me to do it. And I did."

"Rockin' Around the Christmas Tree" is a rockabilly song. The recording features Hank Garland and Harold Bradley on guitar, Floyd Cramer on piano, Boots Randolph on sax, Bob Moore on bass, and veteran session player Buddy Harman on drums. The song is written in the key of A-flat major.

An instrumental version of the song appears as background music in the 1964 television special Rudolph the Red-Nosed Reindeer, which exclusively featured music written by Marks. It can be heard in the scene where Rudolph first arrives at the Reindeer Games and meets another reindeer named Fireball.  A fully sung version of the song would later appear in Rankin/Bass's 1979 sequel Rudolph and Frosty's Christmas in July.  The song was also used in the 1990 film Home Alone during a scene when Kevin McCallister pretends that there is a holiday party taking place in his house, and discourages the burglars from robbing it. The song was also featured in The Christmas Special episode of Regular Show in 2012. The song was also used in D-TV set to the Disney cartoons, Pluto's Christmas Tree and Mickey's Christmas Carol.

Chart performance and sales 
Although Decca released the single in both 1958 and again in 1959, it did not sell well until Lee became a popular star in 1960. That Christmas holiday season, Lee's "Rockin' Around the Christmas Tree" placed on the Billboard Hot 100 chart for the first time, eventually peaking at No. 14. It continued to sell well during subsequent holiday seasons, peaking as high as No. 3 on Billboard's Christmas Singles chart in December 1965. Lee said, "It was magic, and I think we all knew it. It took a few years to take off, but once it did, it really did."

Lee's 1958 recording still receives a great deal of airplay, as radio station formats ranging from top 40 to adult contemporary to country music to oldies to even adult standards have played this version. It has since turned into a perennial holiday favorite, and due to rule changes in 2014 has returned annually to the Billboard Hot 100 chart, reaching an all-time chart peak of No. 2 during the 2019 holiday season.

The song reached over one million in digital downloads by 2016 according to Nielsen SoundScan, making it fifth on the list of all-time best-selling Christmas/holiday digital singles in SoundScan history.  It has sold 1,170,000 copies in the United States as of December 2019.

On the official UK Singles Chart, "Rockin' Around the Christmas Tree" peaked at No. 6 when it was released in the United Kingdom in 1962. In 2013, due to downloads, it became one of a number of songs to re-enter the UK Singles Chart near Christmastime each holiday season. The single peaked at No. 63 on Sunday, December 15, 2013. Then in 2017, it reached No. 9 on the UK Singles Chart, its highest chart position since 1963. On the week ending January 5, 2023, the song reached No. 4, peaking two places higher than its original release 61 years prior.

Track listing
Side A
 "Rockin' Around the Christmas Tree" (Johnny Marks) – 2:02
Side B
 "Papa Noël" (Roy Botkin) – 2:25

Personnel
 Brenda Lee – lead vocals
 Hank Garland – guitar
 Harold Bradley – guitar
 Floyd Cramer – piano
 Bob Moore – bass
 Buddy Harman – drums
 Homer "Boots" Randolph – sax
 Anita Kerr Singers – background vocals

Charts

Weekly charts

Year-end charts

Certifications

|-
!colspan="3"|Streaming
|-

Kim Wilde and Mel Smith version

A version of the song by Kim Wilde and Mel Smith (credited as "Mel & Kim" as a parody of then-popular sister act Mel and Kim), featuring Pete Thomas, reached No. 3 on the UK Singles Chart during the Christmas season 1987. The track was recorded to raise funds for Comic Relief. Its accompanying video featured the two hosting a Christmas party with guests including The Mekon and an appearance from Smith's comedy partner Griff Rhys Jones, carol singers played by the band Curiosity Killed the Cat and Spitting Image puppets of Bette Midler and Tina Turner.

Charts

Certifications

Kacey Musgraves and Camila Cabello version

American country singer Kacey Musgraves released a cover version of the song featuring Cuban-born American pop singer Camila Cabello as a track on her soundtrack album The Kacey Musgraves Christmas Show on November 28, 2019.

Personnel

 Kacey Musgraves – lead vocals
 Camila Cabello – featured artist, vocals
 Adam Keafer – bass
 Brett Resnick – pedal steel
 Kai Welch – moog bass, organ
 Kyle Ryan – background vocals, bells, electric guitar, mellotron, recording engineering, tambourine
 Nat Smith – mellotron
 Scott Quintana – bells, drums, percussion
 Timothy McKay – baritone saxophone
 Gena Johnson – production coordinating, recording engineering
 Mike Abbott – recording engineering
 Leslie Ritcher – studio personnel
 Chip Matthews – studio personnel
 Darrell Thorp – studio personnel
 David Ives – studio personnel

Charts

Justin Bieber version

Canadian singer Justin Bieber released a cover version of the song as a promotional single on November 12, 2020, exclusively on Amazon Music. On October 29, 2021, the song was released on streaming platforms worldwide as an official single.

Background
Talking about the cover, Bieber said: "Rockin' Around the Christmas Tree" has always been one of my favourite songs to celebrate the holidays and I'm excited to team up with Amazon Music to share my own version, with my fans. I'm so thankful to be able to spend the season with loved ones, and to also use this opportunity to give back to LIFT, Inner-City Arts and Alexandria House: three incredible organizations that I've supported in the past. I hope my fans join me in reaching out to the communities and organizations they care about, to help spread joy to those who need it most."

Commercial performance
On December 25, 2020, the song entered the top 20, arriving at #8. The following week, on January 1, 2021, it further climbed to #4, its peak position.

Charts

Certifications

Other recordings
Many artists have recorded the song. The most prominent are:
 1999  Alabama, for their album Christmas Vol. II (this cover version peaked at No. 64 on the Billboard Hot Country Singles & Tracks chart.)
 2004  LeAnn Rimes, for her album What a Wonderful World (this cover version peaked at No. 3 on Billboard Adult Contemporary chart, No. 48 on Billboard Country Singles chart, and No. 30 on Billboard's Holiday Songs chart.)

References

1958 singles
1987 singles
Brenda Lee songs
1910 Fruitgum Company songs
Alabama (American band) songs
LeAnn Rimes songs
American Christmas songs
Comic Relief singles
1958 songs
Songs written by Johnny Marks
Decca Records singles
Def Jam Recordings singles
Rockabilly songs
Kacey Musgraves songs
Camila Cabello songs
Justin Bieber songs
Canadian Hot 100 number-one singles
Number-one singles in New Zealand